Erin Wyatt is an Ohio-born American model and actress who appeared in movies such as Ghosts of Girlfriends Past, Confessions of a Shopaholic, and Wall Street: Money Never Sleeps and television shows such as Ugly Betty and Smash.  In 2009, she appeared with Alec Baldwin in a commercial that aired during the Super Bowl.  Wyatt is primarily a print ad, catalog, and magazine cover model.

References

External links
 
  
 Erin Wyatt at Heffner Management

21st-century American actresses
Actresses from Ohio
Female models from Ohio
Living people
Year of birth missing (living people)